Monee Township is one of 24 townships in Will County, Illinois. As of the 2010 census, its population was 15,669 and it contained 6,182 housing units.  Monee Township used to be known as Carcy Township, but the name was changed at an unknown date.

History

Raccoon Reservation 
After the 1832 Treaty of Tippecanoe, daughters of Marie Bailly, an Odawa orPotawatomi woman, were granted 1,280 acres of land in Monee Township surrounding the site of today's Raccoon Grove Nature Preserve. The reservation was purchased by William B. Ogden of Chicago in 1851.

Cyclone of 1917 
On May 26, 1917 Monee Township was hit by a devastating cyclone. The cyclone, which appeared to have multiple tornadoes, was visible from neighboring Peatone, and left a two to three mile wide path of destruction as it moved from west to east through Will County. Crops were damaged, and at least 50 horses and 100 cattle were killed in Monee and Green Garden townships. The cyclone destroyed multiple homes, wrecked an Illinois Central freight train, drove the water out of Monee Reservoir, and made the road through the wooded picnic grounds at Raccoon Grove impassible. Many trees were downed in the village of Monee, but most structures were spared.

Geography
It includes all of Monee, almost all of University Park as well as a small portion of Park Forest.

Boundaries
Monee Township is bordered by Western Avenue on the east, Steger Road on the north (where Cook County and Will County share a border), Harlem Avenue (Illinois Route 43) on the west, and Offner Road on the south.

Cities, towns, villages
 Monee
 University Park (vast majority)
 Park Forest (small portion)

Adjacent townships
 Rich Township, Cook County (north)
 Bloom Township, Cook County (northeast)
 Crete Township (east)
 Washington Township (southeast)
 Will Township (south)
 Peotone Township (southwest)
 Green Garden Township (west)
 Frankfort Township (northwest)

Cemeteries
The township contains the Saint Paul's United Church of Christ Cemetery.

Major highways
  Illinois Route 50
  Interstate 80

Lakes
 Pine Lake

Landmarks
 Raccoon Grove Nature Preserve

Demographics

Political districts
 Illinois's 2nd congressional district
 State House District 29
 State House District 80
 State Senate District 15
 State Senate District 40

References

External links
Monee Township official website
City-data.com
Illinois State Archives
Township Officials of Illinois
Will County official site

Townships in Will County, Illinois
Townships in Illinois
1849 establishments in Illinois